The Master Key is a 1914 American film serial directed by Robert Z. Leonard. It is considered to be lost, with only episode 5 of 15 surviving in the Library of Congress.

Cast
 Robert Z. Leonard as John Dore
 Ella Hall as Ruth Gallon
 Harry Carter as Harry Wilkerson
 Jean Hathaway as Jean Darnell
 Alfred Hickman as Charles Everett
 Wilbur Higby as Tom Gallon
 Charles Manley as Tom Kane
 Jack Holt as Donald Faversham
 Jim Corey as Wah Sing
 Allan Forrest
 Mack V. Wright
 Rupert Julian
 Cleo Madison
 Edward A. Mills
 James Robert Chandler - (as Robert Chandler)
 Marc Robbins

References

External links

1914 films
1914 short films
American silent short films
American black-and-white films
Universal Pictures film serials
Films directed by Robert Z. Leonard
Lost American films
1914 directorial debut films
1910s American films
1914 lost films
1910s English-language films